The 1920-21 season was the first time Malmö FF competed in a national division. The Swedish Football Association arranged for the best clubs in the country to play in national divisions, before 1920 only certain clubs, mostly clubs from Stockholm and Gothenburg had been able to play for the Swedish football championship which was decided by a cup form competition until the introduction of Allsvenskan in 1924. The 1920-21 season was also significant in the way that it was also Malmö FF's first season with the now iconic skyblue match kit. The club competed in Division 2 Sydsvenska Serien, finishing first and gaining promotion to Division 1 Svenska Serien Västra for the 1922–23 season.

Players

Squad stats

|}

Club

Other information

Competitions

Overall

Division 2 Sydsvenska Serien

League table

Results summary

Results by round

Matches

Svenska Mästerskapet

References
 

1920-21
Association football clubs 1920–21 season
Swedish football clubs 1920–21 season